The David Higham Prize for Fiction was inaugurated in 1975 to mark the 80th birthday of David Higham, literary agent, and was awarded annually to a citizen of the Commonwealth, Republic of Ireland, Pakistan, or South Africa for a first novel or book of short stories. It was cancelled in 1999 due to "the lack of publicity its winners received."

Past winners
1975 - Jane Gardam - Black Faces, White Faces and Matthew Vaughan - Chalky
1976 - Caroline Blackwood - The Stepdaughter
1977 - Patricia Finney - A Shadow of Gulls
1978 - Leslie Norris - Sliding: Short Stories
1979 - John Harvey - The Plate Shop
1980 - Ted Harriot - Keep On Running
1981 - Christopher Hope - A Separate Development
1982 - Glyn Hughes - Where I Used to Play on the Green
1983 - R. M. Lamming - The Notebook of Gismondo Cavalletti
1984 - James Buchan - A Parish of Rich Women
1985 - Patricia Ferguson - Family Myths and Legends
1986 - Jim Crace - Continent
1987 - Adam Zameenzad - The Thirteenth House
1988 - Carol Birch - Life in the Palace
1989 - Tim O'Grady - Motherland
1990 - Russell Celyn Jones - Soldiers and Innocents
1991 - John Loveday - Halo
1992 - Elspeth Barker - O Caledonia
1993 - Nicola Barker - Love Your Enemies 
1994 - Fred D'Aguiar - The Longest Memory
1995 - Vikram Chandra - Red Earth and Pouring Rain
1996 - Linda Grant - The Cast Iron Shore
1997 - Ronald Wright - A Scientific Romance
1998 - Gavin Kramer - Shopping

References
Awards up to 1988: Prizewinning Literature: UK Literary Award Winners by Anne Strachan, publ. 1989 by Library Association Publishing Ltd 

First book awards
British fiction awards
Awards established in 1975
Awards disestablished in 1999
1975 establishments in the United Kingdom
1999 disestablishments in the United Kingdom

Commonwealth literary awards
Irish literary awards
Pakistani literary awards
South African literary awards
South African literary events